"All You Need Is Me" is a 2008 song by Morrissey that is featured on his Greatest Hits album. It was released as a single on 2 June 2008 in the UK for only one week, reaching number 24 on the UK Singles Chart as well as becoming his first number one single on the Scottish Singles Chart, which at that point counted physical sales only. The song is also on his studio album Years of Refusal.

The B-side of the Decca (#4780964) single "My Dearest Love" was written by Morrissey along with Alain Whyte, the two being responsible for lyrics and music respectively. The song was recorded in Los Angeles and produced by Oscar and BAFTA winning composer Gustavo Santaolalla, responsible for Brokeback Mountain, Babel and The Motorcycle Diaries. The song received additional production by Jerry Finn, the man behind 2004’s You Are the Quarry.

Track listing
CD: Decca / 4780965
 "All You Need Is Me" (Morrissey, Jesse Tobias)
 "Children in Pieces" (Morrissey, Tobias)

7": Decca / 4780964
 "All You Need Is Me" (Morrissey, Tobias)
 "My Dearest Love" (Morrissey, Alain Whyte)

7": Decca / 4780963
 "All You Need Is Me" (Morrissey, Tobias)
 "Drive-In Saturday" (David Bowie) (live Omaha 11 May 2007)

Personnel
 Morrissey – vocals
 Boz Boorer – guitar
 Jesse Tobias – guitar
 Solomon Walker – bass guitar
 Matt Walker – drums
 Roger Manning – keyboard
 Michael Farrell – keyboard (B-sides only)
 Jerry Finn – producer

Charts

References

Morrissey songs
2008 singles
Songs written by Morrissey
Songs written by Jesse Tobias
Song recordings produced by Gustavo Santaolalla
2008 songs
Decca Records singles
Number-one singles in Scotland